François Méthot (born April 26, 1978) is a Canadian former professional ice hockey centre. He was the Buffalo Sabres' third pick, 54th overall, in the 1996 NHL Entry Draft from the Shawinigan Cataractes, but never played a game in the NHL.

Born in Montreal, Quebec, he played five seasons with the Rochester Americans and one with the Portland Pirates, both of the American Hockey League, before moving to Germany. He played one season each for the Augsburger Panther and the Nürnberg Ice Tigers before going to Mannheim.

On May 24, 2011, Methot left Mannheim after five seasons and signed a one-year contract with fellow DEL team, Krefeld Pinguine.

Career statistics

References

External links

1978 births
Living people
Adler Mannheim players
Augsburger Panther players
Buffalo Sabres draft picks
EHC München players
French Quebecers
Ice hockey people from Montreal
Krefeld Pinguine players
Nürnberg Ice Tigers players
Portland Pirates players
Rochester Americans players
Rouyn-Noranda Huskies players
Saint-Hyacinthe Laser players
Shawinigan Cataractes players
Canadian expatriate ice hockey players in Germany
Canadian ice hockey centres